Edward Packard may refer to:

 Edward Packard (writer) (born 1931), American writer
 Edward Packard (businessman, born 1819) (1819–1899), founder of Fisons
 Edward Packard (businessman, born 1843) (1843–1932), his son who developed the business